The 2023 Dubai Tennis Championships (also known as the Dubai Duty Free Tennis Championships for sponsorship reasons) was a professional ATP 500 event on the 2023 ATP Tour and a WTA 1000 tournament on the 2023 WTA Tour. Both events were held at the Aviation Club Tennis Centre in Dubai, United Arab Emirates. The women's tournament took place from February 19 to 25, and the men's tournament from February 27 to March 4.

Champions

Men's singles

  Daniil Medvedev def.  Andrey Rublev, 6–2, 6–2

Women's singles

  Barbora Krejčíková def.  Iga Świątek, 6–4, 6–2

Men's doubles

  Maxime Cressy /  Fabrice Martin def.  Lloyd Glasspool /  Harri Heliövaara, 7–6(7–2), 6–4

Women's doubles

  Veronika Kudermetova /  Liudmila Samsonova def.  Chan Hao-ching /  Latisha Chan, 6–4, 6–7(4–7), [10–1]

Points and prize money

Point distribution

Prize money

*per team

ATP singles main-draw entrants

Seeds 

 Rankings are as of February 20, 2023.

Other entrants 
The following players received wildcards into the singles main draw:
  Malek Jaziri
  Thanasi Kokkinakis
  Alexei Popyrin

The following players received entry from the qualifying draw:
  Pavel Kotov 
  Alexandar Lazarov 
  Tomáš Macháč 
  Christopher O'Connell

The following players received entry as lucky losers:
  Matteo Arnaldi 
  Quentin Halys
  Francesco Passaro
  Alexander Shevchenko

Withdrawals 
  Roberto Bautista Agut → replaced by  Quentin Halys
  Benjamin Bonzi → replaced by  Francesco Passaro
  Pablo Carreño Busta → replaced by  Tallon Griekspoor
  Marin Čilić → replaced by  Maxime Cressy
  Jack Draper → replaced by  Filip Krajinović
  Lloyd Harris → replaced by  Mikael Ymer
  Kwon Soon-woo → replaced by  Matteo Arnaldi
  Andy Murray → replaced by  Alexander Shevchenko
  Rafael Nadal → replaced by  Marc-Andrea Hüsler

ATP doubles main-draw entrants

Seeds 

 Rankings are as of February 20, 2023.

Other entrants
The following pairs received wildcards into the doubles main draw:
  Kareem Al Allaf /  Abdulrahman Al Janahi  
  Aisam-ul-Haq Qureshi /  Ramkumar Ramanathan 

The following pair received entry from the qualifying draw:
  Andrew Harris /  John-Patrick Smith

The following pairs received entry as lucky losers:
  Yuki Bhambri /  Saketh Myneni
  Sander Gillé /  Joran Vliegen

Withdrawals
  Dan Evans /  John Peers → replaced by  Sander Gillé /  Joran Vliegen
  Constant Lestienne /  Botic van de Zandschulp → replaced by  Yuki Bhambri /  Saketh Myneni

WTA singles main-draw entrants

Seeds 

 Rankings are as of February 13, 2023.

Other entrants
The following players received wildcards into the singles main draw:
  Linda Fruhvirtová
  Sofia Kenin
  Marta Kostyuk
  İpek Öz
  Vera Zvonareva

The following players received entry into the main draw through a protected ranking:
  Karolína Muchová
  Anastasia Pavlyuchenkova
  Markéta Vondroušová

The following players received entry from the qualifying draw:
  Ana Bogdan
  Julia Grabher
  Rebeka Masarova
  Jasmine Paolini
  Laura Siegemund
  Viktoriya Tomova
  Dayana Yastremska
  Katarina Zavatska

The following players received entry into the main draw as lucky losers:
  Lauren Davis
  Claire Liu

Withdrawals 
 Before the tournament
  Ekaterina Alexandrova → replaced by  Claire Liu
  Ons Jabeur → replaced by  Yulia Putintseva
  Anett Kontaveit → replaced by  Shelby Rogers
  Anastasia Potapova → replaced by  Lauren Davis
 During the tournament
  Elena Rybakina (lower back injury)

WTA doubles main-draw entrants

Seeds 

 Rankings are as of February 13, 2023.

Other entrants
The following pairs received wildcards into the doubles main draw:
  Ana Bogdan /  Angelina Gabueva 
  Harriet Dart  /  Eden Silva
  Sofia Kenin /  Ekaterina Yashina

The following pair received entry as alternates:
  Linda Fruhvirtová /  Kaia Kanepi

Withdrawals
 Before the tournament
  Miriam Kolodziejová /  Markéta Vondroušová → replaced by  Ekaterina Alexandrova /  Tereza Mihalíková
  Anastasia Potapova /  Yana Sizikova → replaced by  Linda Fruhvirtová /  Kaia Kanepi
 During the tournament
  Anastasia Pavlyuchenkova /  Elena Rybakina (lower back injury)

References

External links
 Official website

2023
2023 ATP Tour
2023 WTA Tour
 
February 2023 sports events in the United Arab Emirates
March 2023 sports events in the United Arab Emirates
2023 in Emirati tennis